Ma Su (born 17 February 1981) is a Chinese actress.

Ma ranked 46th on Forbes China Celebrity 100 list in 2013, 76th in 2014, and 84th in 2015.

Life and career
Ma's name is a combination of her parents' surnames — Ma (her father's) and Su (her mother's).

Ma graduated from the People's Liberation Army Arts College in 1998, majoring in dance. She worked as a model for some television commercials after her graduation. In 2002, she made her acting debut in High Flying Songs of Tang Dynasty, a historical television series set in the Tang dynasty. A year later, she graduated from the Beijing Film Academy.

Ma first rose to fame for her role as the repressed and rebellious young lady in the youth drama  Spring in Summer  (2003).

In 2009, Ma gained acclaim for her performance in the romantic period drama North Wind Blows. She won the Best Prospect award at the Shanghai Television Festival. Ma then starred in modern romance series My Beautiful Life (2010); her role as the "little nanny" was loved by the audience and established her acting recognition among the masses. She achieved further acclaim with her portrayal of a female bandit in war drama Highest Amnesty, and was also nominated for the Best Supporting Actress award at the Hundred Flowers Awards for her performance in Iron Man, a film about those who struggled to develop China’s oil industry in the Taklamakan desert in West China.

Ma then played the titular protagonist in the period drama Beauty of Innocence (2011); her interpretation of the beautiful and strong-willed character won over many critics, and Ma won the Audience's Choice for Actress at the Golden Eagle Awards. She then starred in her first spy drama, Cheongsam (2011) wherein she played a special agent. Her performance in the series won her the Best Actress award at the Huading Awards.

2012 was Ma's most successful year yet. She starred in Beijing Youth, the third installment of Zhao Baogang's Youth trilogy; which won her the Best Actress award at the Huading Awards. She next starred in wuxia drama The Bride with White Hair, and received acclaim for her portrayal of Lian Nishang. The same year, Ma was named the Flying Apsaras Award for Outstanding Actress for her performance in both Beijing Youth and Beauty of Innocence; becoming the first Chinese actress born after the 1980s to nab a win at both the Flying Apsaras Awards and Golden Eagle Awards. Due to her successful performance in various television series, Ma was named the "Television Figure of the Year" at the China TV Drama Awards.

In 2014, Ma co-starred in the comedy film Breakup Buddies; her breakthrough performance as a loud-mouth and couth prostitute earned positive reviews and she won the Best Supporting Actress awards at the Chinese American Film Festival and China Film Festival London. Ma also guest-starred in the historical drama The Legend of Mi Yue (2015), wherein she played her first antagonist role.

Filmography

Film

Television series

Awards and nominations

References

External links 
 

1981 births
Living people
People's Liberation Army Arts College alumni
Actresses from Harbin
Beijing Film Academy alumni
Chinese film actresses
Chinese television actresses
21st-century Chinese actresses